The Rock Island Depot is a historic railroad station at 157 North Front Street, Hazen, Arkansas.  It is a single story stuccoed brick building with Mediterranean style, built in 1915 by the Chicago, Rock Island and Pacific Railroad (aka the "Rock Island Line").  Its main facade is oriented south, toward the former railroad tracks, with a projecting telegrapher's booth.  It is topped by a tile roof with broad eaves supported by large brackets.

The building was listed on the National Register of Historic Places in 1987.

See also
National Register of Historic Places listings in Prairie County, Arkansas

References

Railway stations on the National Register of Historic Places in Arkansas
Railway stations in the United States opened in 1915
Hazen
National Register of Historic Places in Prairie County, Arkansas
Mediterranean Revival architecture in Arkansas
1915 establishments in Arkansas
Former railway stations in Arkansas